Hull City Association Football Club, an English association football club based in Kingston upon Hull, East Riding of Yorkshire, was founded in 1904. The team's first competitive matches came in the FA Cup, being beaten 4–1 by Stockton in a replay following a 3–3 draw, before they were elected to the Football League Second Division ahead of the 1905–06 season. Hull missed out on promotion in the 1909–10 season, having an inferior goal average to Oldham Athletic and finishing in third. The 1929–30 season saw Hull relegated to the Third Division North after 21 seasons in the Second Division while reaching the semi-final of the FA Cup, where they were beaten by Arsenal after a replay. Promotion back to the Second Division was achieved three years later, with the Third Division North championship becoming the club's first major honour. However, they were relegated in the 1935–36 season and it was 13 years before another return to the Second Division was made, when, under the player-management of former England international Raich Carter, the Third Division North title was won. Relegation back to this division came in the 1955–56 season and following League reorganisation implemented for the 1958–59 season Hull won promotion in the Third Division's inaugural season, although they were relegated after one year.

The Third Division championship was won in the 1965–66 season and Hull remained in the Second Division for 12 years before relegation in 1978. Hull reached the semi-final of the Watney Cup in the tournament's inaugural staging in 1970, where they were beaten by Manchester United in a penalty shoot-out; this was the first game in English football to be decided by this method. The Final of this competition was reached in 1974, where Hull were beaten by Stoke City. Relegation to the Fourth Division for the first time in the club's history came in 1981 and a return to the Third Division was secured two years later in the 1982–83 season. The season after, Hull reached the final of the Associate Members' Cup in its inaugural season and were beaten by AFC Bournemouth. Promotion to the Second Division came the following season, although relegations in the 1990–91 and 1995–96 seasons saw the club return to the fourth tier.

Hull's first play-off campaign ended unsuccessfully, being beaten by Leyton Orient in the semi-final in the 2000–01 season. However, successive promotions in the 2003–04 and 2004–05 seasons saw Hull rise from the fourth tier to the second tier in a space of two years. After 104 years of existence, Hull were promoted to the Premier League for the first time in their history, beating Watford in the play-off semi-finals and Bristol City in the 2008 Football League Championship play-off Final. Hull's first Premier League season saw safety from relegation ensured on the last day of the season, although the club was relegated the following season after finishing 19th in the league. Three years later, Hull returned to the Premier League after finishing the 2012–13 season as Championship runners-up. In the 2013–14 season they achieved their highest ever league finish of 16th and were runners-up to Arsenal in their first ever FA Cup Final appearance. Since then, they have been relegated to the Championship and promoted again.

Since their election to the Football League in 1905, Hull have spent 5 seasons in the first tier, 62 in the second, 30 (plus the abandoned 1939–40 season) in the third, and 10 in the fourth (current to the end of the 2022–23 season). The table below details Hull City's achievements in senior first team competition from the 1904–05 season to the end of the most recently completed season.

Key

Top scorer shown alongside # when he was also top scorer in that division.
Division shown alongside † when it changes due to promotion, relegation or reorganisation.
League results shown in italics for competitions abandoned due to war.

Key to league record:
 Pld – Matches played
 W – Matches won
 D – Matches drawn
 L – Matches lost
 GF – Goals for
 GA – Goals against
 Pts – Points
 Pos – Final position
 ↑ – Promoted
 ↓ – Relegated

Key to divisions:
 Champ – EFL Championship
 Div 2 – Football League Second Division
 Div 3 – Football League Third Division
 Div 3N – Football League Third Division North
 Div 4 – Football League Fourth Division
 Lge 1 – EFL League One
 Prem – Premier League

Key to rounds:
 Grp – Group stage
 GrpN – Group stage Northern section
 PR – Preliminary round
 R1 – Round 1, etc.
 R1N – Round 1 Northern section, etc.
 QFN – Quarter-final Northern section
 SF – Semi-final
 SFN – Semi-final Northern section
 FN – Final Northern section
 RU – Runners-up
 DNE – Did not enter

Seasons

Footnotes

References

External links
 Hull City A.F.C. official website

Seasons
 
Hull City